Björke Church is a medieval church in Björke on the Swedish island of Gotland, in the Diocese of Visby.

The nave is the oldest part of Björke Church, dating from the mid-13th century. The choir dates from the middle of the 14th century and replaced an earlier choir, half the size of the present one. A church tower was planned but never built. The sacristy is the last part to be added the church; it dates from 1860.

Internally, the church ceiling is supported by six vaults – two in the choir and four, resting on a central column, in the nave. Among the furnishings, the crucifix dates from 1160 and the pulpit from 1594; it is one of the oldest on Gotland. Of later date are the altarpiece (1911) and the votive ship, donated to the church in 2004.

The church underwent a renovation in 1910–12.

Björke Church belongs to the Church of Sweden and lies within the Diocese of Visby.

References

External links 

Gothic architecture in Sweden
Churches in Gotland County
Churches in the Diocese of Visby
Churches converted from the Roman Catholic Church to the Church of Sweden